Sol, so, or G is the fifth note of the fixed-do solfège starting on C. It is the fifth note and the eighth semitone of the solfège. As such it is the dominant, a perfect fifth above C or perfect fourth below C.

When calculated in equal temperament with a reference of A above middle C as 440 Hz, the frequency of middle G (G4) note is approximately 391.995 Hz. See pitch for a discussion of historical variations in frequency.

It has enharmonic equivalents of F (F-double sharp) and A (A-double flat).

Designation by octave

Scales

Common scales beginning on G
 G major: G A B C D E F G
 G natural minor: G A B C D E F G
 G harmonic minor: G A B C D E F G
 G melodic minor ascending: G A B C D E F G
 G melodic minor descending: G F E D C B A G

Diatonic scales
 G Ionian: G A B C D E F G
 G Dorian: G A B C D E F G
 G Phrygian: G A B C D E F G
 G Lydian: G A B C D E F G
 G Mixolydian: G A B C D E F G
 G Aeolian: G A B C D E F G
 G Locrian: G A B C D E F G

Jazz melodic minor
 G ascending melodic minor: G A B C D E F G
 G Dorian ♭2: G A B C D E F G
 G Lydian augmented: G A B C D E F G
 G Lydian dominant: G A B C D E F G
 G Mixolydian ♭6: G A B C D E F G
 G Locrian ♮2: G A B C D E F G
 G Altered: G A B C D E F G

In popular culture
It is the first note of the 2006 song "Welcome to the Black Parade" by My Chemical Romance, which made the note a meme.

See also
 Piano key frequencies
 G major
 G minor
 Root (chord)

References

Musical notes